The Ahmik River is a  tributary of the Saint Louis River of Minnesota, United States.

See also
List of rivers of Minnesota

References

Minnesota Watersheds
USGS Hydrologic Unit Map - State of Minnesota (1974)

Rivers of Minnesota